Świętajno is a village in Olecko County, Warmian-Masurian Voivodeship, in north-eastern Poland. It is the seat of the gmina (administrative district) called Gmina Świętajno. It is located on the northern and eastern shore of Lake Świętajno in the region of Masuria.

The village has a population of 1,600.

The Area has one main lake beach for people to relax at but several more dotted around the lake.

History
The village was founded in 1554 and was inhabited by Poles. As of 1719, the village had an exclusively Polish population.

References

Populated lakeshore places in Poland
Villages in Olecko County
1554 establishments in Poland
Populated places established in 1554